The giant coua (Coua gigas) is a bird species from the coua genus in the cuckoo family that is endemic to the dry forests of western and southern Madagascar. It is suggested that couas probably originated from a particular Asian ground-cuckoo (Dinets 2007). The genus coua contains 10 species, more than any other genus in Madagascar (Moreau 1966). Although the bird is listed under least concern (LC) in the IUCN Red List of Threatened Species, it only persists in the biological hot spot of Madagascar, warranting its recognition as a species of conservation concern at the global scale.

Taxonomy
The giant coua was described by the French polymath Georges-Louis Leclerc, Comte de Buffon in 1780 in his Histoire Naturelle des Oiseaux. The bird was also illustrated in a hand-coloured plate engraved by François-Nicolas Martinet in the Planches Enluminées D'Histoire Naturelle which was produced under the supervision of Edme-Louis Daubenton to accompany Buffon's text. Neither the plate caption nor Buffon's description included a scientific name but in 1783 the Dutch naturalist Pieter Boddaert coined the binomial name Cuculus gigas in his catalogue of the Planches Enluminées. The giant coua is now placed in the genus Coua that was erected by the Swiss naturalist Heinrich Rudolf Schinz in 1821. The generic name is from koa, the Malagasy word for the couas. The specific epithet gigas is the Latin word for "giant". The species is monotypic.

Description
As a member of the cuckoo family, they have a reversible third toe and resemble coucals in their method of scrambling through entangled vines for food. Observations indicate that they can climb 10 metres high from the ground.

Coua gigas subsist on seeds (Capurodendron madagascariensis and Buxus madagascariensis), insects and some small vertebrates such as chameleons (Furcifer sp.). This species of bird is often encountered in large unlogged gallery forests that lack dense shrub layers, which provides greater mobility and implies a preference for undisturbed forest with tall trees. Studies indicate that in logged forests, giant couas usually glean during dry seasons and more often leap and sally during rainy seasons. In contrast, they have been found to do the opposite in forested areas (more often glean during rainy seasons and more often probe during dry seasons), which suggests the significant role that environment plays in foraging behaviour. Giant coua tend to utilise microhabitats in logged forests with a greater canopy cover, and forage in logged gallery forests with higher canopies than other areas while avoiding sites with more stems and obstacles .

Distribution and habitat
Coua gigas is found in the lowlands of western and southern Madagascar up to 700 metres(Sibley 2007). The range of this bird species is considered large with an estimated global extent of occurrence of 50,000-100,000 km2. Global population size has not been quantified but is believed to be large since it is described as 'common' in at least parts of its range. Similarly, global population trends are not available, and even though it is believed that the species is not approaching the population decline thresholds for the criterion of the IUCN Red List (i.e. declining more than 30% in ten years or three generations), there is evidence for population decline. This summarizes the reasons for evaluating giant coua as least concern by the official Red List Authority for birds for IUCN.

Conservation status
Several studies support the need to conserve the giant coua. C. gigas is among the locally vulnerable species of Madagascar that are occasionally hunted and trapped by children (Ellis 2003). Disturbance by fire or logging can potentially compromise their resource use and result in an added threat to these species. Human alteration modifies the habitat structure and affects foraging behavior and habitat selection. Selective logging is a major disturbance for forest insectivorous birds such as the giant coua. Logging reduces C. gigas density, and increased logging or burning could reduce the optimal habitat and decrease the population density of this species. It behoves the conservation authorities to retain a diversity of foraging nutrients in different habitat types to sustain the normal foraging activities of these birds.

Continual studies of giant coua's foraging compliments forest conservation. Selective logging could be restricted to the typically dry forest while gallery forests could be kept as corridors for conservation, especially for this bird species. Conservation of the gallery forest would be improved by logging both forest types (gallery & dry) at the same rate and implementing fire control measures.

Recent sightings in Sainte Luce testify that the tail of the giant coua appears to be longer than in other regions (Ellis 2003). This negates the supposition that the genus coua has no morphological specialization, instead indicating distinctive morphological differences that warrant further studies for species change (Moreau 1966). Sainte Luce is currently one of the best areas to see these birds in certain forest fragments that should have long-term management to foster limited populations (Ellis 2003). As one of the proposed conservation zones currently managed by the local community, the region has great potential for eco-tourism to promote continued conservation of the species (Ellis 2003).

See also
 Endemic birds of Madagascar and western Indian Ocean islands

References

 BirdLife International (2007). Species factsheet: Coua gigas (2/6/2007).
 Dinets, V Birds of Madagascar, including Couas Homepage of Vladimir Dinets: Madagascar Part 5 of 12 Retrieved on 23 May 2007.
 
 Sibley, CG. Family Cuculidae: Coua gigas. Avifauna - Picchio Verde ... l'altro web site - Birds: DNA Sibley's list, 11 (Non Passeriformes) Retrieved on 26 April 2007.
 Ellis, ER (2003). Avifaunal population present in the remaining littoral forests of Southeastern Madagascar [pdf]. Bird Study Report. Azafady Retrieved on 26 April 2007.

External links

 Giant Coua Species Range

Photo links
 http://calphotos.berkeley.edu/cgi/img_query?query_src=&enlarge=0024+3291+2008+0059

Coua
Birds described in 1783